Chaganti is an Indian surname.

People with the name
 Chaganti Koteswara Rao (born 1959), Indian speaker on Sanatana Dharma
 Chaganti Somayajulu (1915–1994), Telugu writer

See also
 Chaganti Vari Palem, a village in Guntur district

Surnames of Indian origin